Arbor Park School District 145 is a school district headquartered in Oak Forest, Illinois in Greater Chicago. It serves Oak Forest and Tinley Park.

Schools
Lower secondary: 
 Arbor Park Middle School
Primary:
 Kimberly Heights School
 Morton Gingerwood School
 Scarlet Oak School
Other:
 Kids Club Child Care Program

Notable people 
 Lee Martin, Pulitzer Prize Finalist  author of The Bright Forever. He attended Kimberly Heights Elementary and Arbor Park Middle School from 1963 until 1969

References

External links
 Arbor Park School District 145

School districts in Cook County, Illinois